Villali Veeran  is a 2014 Indian Malayalam Action comedy film, produced by Super Good Films under the banner of Remya Release and directed by Sudheesh Shanker. The film stars Dileep in the lead role along with Namitha Pramod, Mythili, Siddique, Kalabhavan Shajon, Dharmajan Bolgatty, Sai Kumar, Suresh Krishna, Riyaz Khan, Babu Antony, Saju Kodiyan, Neena Kurup, Geetha Vijayan, Valsala Menon, Vinaya Prasad, Nedumudi Venu and Lalu Alex in supporting roles. The film was initially titled Bhuddhettan.

Upon release the film received negative reviews critics and audiences alike.

Synopsis

Siddharthan an ordinary man whose love and care towards his sisters is profound. He spends lavishly and does anything for their satisfaction. But he is stingy when it comes to his own needs. This changed when Narmada comes to his life.

Cast
Dileep as Siddharthan
Namitha Pramod as Narmada, Siddharthan's love interest
Mythili as Aishwarya Giridhar
Siddique as Chandrasekaran, Siddharthan's father
Kalabhavan Shajon as Sugunan
Dharmajan Bolgatty as Jyothisharathnam Poomeni Illath Brahmashri Biju Brahmanan
Sai Kumar as Kadamberi Viswanathan
Suresh Krishna  as Gautaman Viswanathan
Riyaz Khan as Giridhar Viswanathan
Nedumudi Venu as Damodarji
Lalu Alex as Narendra Menon
Kannan Nair as Srabhikkal Joji
Rafi
Nisha Sarang
K. B. Ganesh Kumar as Pavithran
Babu Antony as Commissioner 
Ambika Mohan 
Sajitha Betti
Valsala Menon
Vinaya Prasad as Narmada's Mother 
Manasa Radhakrishnan (child artist- Sandra)
Kritika Pradeep
Seetha as Siddharthan's mother
Rajesh Hebbar as Mahadevan

Soundtrack
 "Cinderella Chandame" performed by Karthik, Rimi Tomy
 "Ni Kannilminnum" performed by Ranjith, Jyotsna Radhakrishnan
 "Eante Manasin" performed by Vijay Yesudas, Swetha Mohan
 "Villaliveeran" performed by S. A. Rajkumar, Vijay Yesudas

References

External links 
 

2014 films
2010s Malayalam-language films
Super Good Films films